Ancotrema sportella, common name the beaded lancetooth, is a species of air-breathing land snail, a terrestrial pulmonate gastropod mollusk in the family Haplotrematidae.

References

Haplotrematidae
Gastropods described in 1846